Seeking.com (formerly known as SeekingArrangement) is an American online dating service founded by Brandon Wade in San Francisco, California, in 2006. Wade was previously the CEO of the company until June 2022 when he was succeeded by Ruben Buell, who will serve as CEO of Reflex Media, the company that maintains Seeking.com.

History 
Seeking.com was founded as SeekingArrangement.com in 2006 by Brandon Wade, who was born in Singapore and later moved to the U.S. to attend the Massachusetts Institute of Technology. By 2009, the website reported more than 300,000 registered members and had an active blog in which users debated different subjects related to sugar dating.

In 2010, the website began offering free Premium Memberships to students who register using their university email addresses. By January 2013, the website reported 2 million users, of which 44 percent were college students after seeing a significant increase in college students registering for the site compared to the previous year.

When the 2012 Republican National Convention took place in Tampa Bay, Florida, the website saw a 25.9% increase of site users stemming from this geographic area. This increase translates to the average of 1,823 daily users increasing to 2,295 accessing the site at this reported time. According to The Huffington Post, of the 200,000 Sugar Daddy users, 42.1% reportedly identify as Republicans and 34.9% as Democrats. In October 2013, the website had a surge in registrations during the U.S. federal government shutdown.

In 2014, over 1.4 million students were registered on the website. Requests from Sugar Babies varied from assistance with college expenses to monthly allowances for living expenses. In 2015, SeekingArrangement released a list of the top 20 colleges attended by women using the website as sugar babies. The number one university on the list was the University of Texas. Other information on sugar babies was also provided such as the average allowance and a breakdown of what women spent it on.

By 2016, the website reported having five million members and that it generated nearly $40 million in revenue each year. The same year, Doug Richard admitted to sexual activity with a 13-year-old girl met through SeekingArrangement, believing her to be 17 at the time. The court heard that the 13-year-old girl in question told Richards on a number of occasions that she was 17. On January 29, 2016, Richard was cleared of all charges brought against him by a unanimous jury decision.

In 2021, The New York Times reported that Joel Greenberg, the former Seminole County tax collector indicted on federal sex trafficking charges, used the site to meet women. Rep. Matt Gaetz also allegedly used the site.

By February 2022, the website had completed a rebrand to Seeking.com as part of a strategy advertising shift. In June 2022, the websites founder Wade stepped down as CEO and was succeeded by Ruben Buell, who will serve as CEO of Reflex Media, the company that maintains Seeking.com and several other similar websites.

Operations 
The company's business model is based on a membership system. Members are able to register for site services free of charge, which provides them with a limited number of messages. Members have the option to either purchase credits for expanded messaging privileges on a monthly basis or on an annual basis with Premium and Diamond Memberships. The website is used in more 130 countries and includes versions of the interface in eight languages. The company headquarters is presently located in Las Vegas, NV. There are additional offices located in Ukraine and Singapore.

References

External links 

Online dating services of the United States
Internet properties established in 2006
2006 establishments in the United States
Adult dating websites